Samuel Rosborough Balcom (March 24, 1888 – May 4, 1981) was a Canadian politician, businessman and pharmacist. He was elected to the House of Commons of Canada in a June 19, 1950 by-election as a Member of the Liberal Party representing the riding of Halifax, after Isnor was called to the Senate. He was re-elected in 1953 and defeated in 1957. Prior to his federal political experience, he was a commanding officer in medical stores during World War II between 1942 and 1942. Between 1944 and 1945, he was chief medical stores inspection officer in the Canadian Army.

Electoral record

External links

1888 births
1981 deaths
Canadian pharmacists
Liberal Party of Canada MPs
Members of the House of Commons of Canada from Nova Scotia